My Family and Other Animals is a 1987 British TV mini-series produced by the BBC and directed by Peter Barber-Fleming. It is based on Gerald Durrell's autobiographical book by the same name, My Family and Other Animals, which tells about the time his family spent on the Greek Island of Corfu in 1935–1939. The series consists of 10 episodes and was aired for the first time between 17 October and 19 December 1987.

Plot 
The show tells the story of the extravagant Durrell family who, tired of the rainy and unhealthy English climate, move to the sun-drenched Greek island of Corfu. The family consists of Gerry (young naturalist), his widowed mother (excellent cook), his eldest brother Larry (starting writer), another brother Leslie (mad about guns and boats) and sister Margo (who suffers from acne). In Corfu they experience a lot of adventures and befriend many interesting people, including Spìro, a taxi driver who lived for many years in Chicago where he learned to speak broken English, and doctor Theodore Stephanides, a polymath who, just like Gerry, adores nature and helps him explore the island's varied wildlife.

Filming and production 
The £2 million production was a combined effort by the BBC's Drama Department and Natural History Unit. Exterior scenes were filmed in Corfu in the summer of 1987. It was intended that there should be at least three minutes of natural history footage for every half-hour episode, and twenty scorpions, ten praying mantises, three giant toads, a number of snakes, tortoises, terrapins, barn owls and pigeons trained to dance had been brought to Corfu, together with six hundred frozen mice, as food for the snakes. At the end of July 1987, Gerald Durrell flew out to Corfu to be present for the last few days of the filming. He gave invaluable advice to the production team at the scripting stage, demanding the power of veto over only one thing – the casting of his mother. He felt Hannah Gordon fitted the bill perfectly:

She's absolutely superb. She picks up beautifully my mother's slightly flustered, not-quite-with-it-half-the-time air, and not knowing, if the family were squabbling, whose side to take.

None of the family's three villas proved to be suitable locations fifty years on, and substitutes had to be found (for the record, the Villa Fundana near Skripero stood in for the Strawberry-Pink Villa, the Curcumeli Villa at Afra was used for the interiors of the Daffodil-Yellow Villa and the Bogdanos Villa near Pyrghi for the exteriors, while the Snow-White Villa was impersonated by Kyriakis' House at Poulades).

To celebrate the end of the filming, Gerald Durrell sent out a home-made invitation, decorated with his cartoon animals, for all concerned to come to a party and barbecue at the grand old Curcumeli mansion at Afra:

The Real Durrells invite the Other Durrells, Spiro, Theo and all who worked on the production (even the Producer). For the sake of the reputation of the BBC, please endeavour to remain sober for at least fifteen minutes.

Cast 
 Darren Redmayne as Gerry (Gerald Durrell) – 10 episodes
 Hannah Gordon as Mrs. (Louisa) Durrell – 10 episodes
 Brian Blessed as Spiro Halikiopoulos – 10 episodes
 Anthony Calf as Larry (Lawrence Durrell) – 10 episodes
 Guy Scantlebury as Leslie Durrell – 10 episodes
 Sarah-Jane Holm as Margo (Margaret Durrell) – 10 episodes
 Christopher Godwin as Dr. Theodore Stephanides – 7 episodes
 John Normington as Kralefsky – 3 episodes
 Dina Konsta as Lugaretzia – 3 episodes
 Paul Rhys as George (Wilkinson) – 2 episodes
 Angela Barlow as Mrs. Harcum – 2 episodes
 George Dialegmenos as Kosti the convict – 2 episodes
 Tonis Giakovakis as Dr. Androuchelli – 2 episodes
 Mihalis Giannatos as Yani – 2 episodes
 Edward Parsons as Mr. Harcum – 2 episodes
 Christos Efthimiou as Theodosius – 1 episode
 David Gant as Zatopec – 1 episode
 Bob Goody as Durant – 1 episode
 Philip Herbert as Michael – 1 episode
 Ayub Khan-Din as Yasha – 1 episode
 Evelyn Laye as Mrs. Kralefsky – 1 episode
 Charmian May as Melanie, Countess de Torro – 1 episode
 Cathy Murphy as Jonquil – 1 episode
 Stathis Psaltis as the Rose-Beetle Man – 1 episode
 Nick Reding as Peter – 1 episode
 Evagelia Samiotaki as Agathi – 1 episode
 Hristos Valavanidis as the customs officer – 1 episode

Soundtrack 

The soundtrack to the show was written by Daryl Runswick. It includes the following tracks:
 Main Theme
 The Rose-Beetle Man
 Caterpillars and Spiders
 Spiro and the Scorpions
 Sleep and Cypresses
 Gerry and Roger
Whistler: Ken Barrie.Singer: Mary King.

See also
 Gerald Durrell's Corfu trilogy books:
My Family and Other Animals (1956)
 Birds, Beasts, and Relatives (1969)
 The Garden of the Gods (1978)
 My Family and Other Animals (2005), a television film based on the book by the same name
 The Durrells (2016–2019), an ITV drama television series loosely based on the Corfu trilogy

References

External links 
 My Family and Other Animals (1987 series) on IMDb.
 Full soundtrack of the series.

1987 films